Dave Gregson, (born 27 November 1973) is a disability rights and anti-bullying campaigner. He is best known for winning a tribunal case against his former employer, United Response, who state on their website that they are "a top 100 charity committed to making life better for young people and adults with learning disabilities, autism and mental health needs". They dismissed Gregson in December 2018 under the capability policy due to his autism and mental health difficulties.

Early years and career
Dave Gregson was born in Harrogate in 1973 and was brought up in Wetherby in West Yorkshire. He attended Crossley Street Primary School from 1978 to 1985 and then Wetherby High School from 1985 to 1992. He attended Askham Bryan College from 1992 to 1995 where he acquired a Higher National Diploma in Amenity Horticulture. He worked in nursery stock production and landscaping before a change of career path in 1996 when he started working for the Harrogate-based charity, Yorkshire Association for Disabled People (now known as Disability Action Yorkshire). He was promoted to Supervisor and during this period qualified with an NVQ Level 4 Certificate in Management in Health and Social Care with Leeds Beckett University. Gregson secured a job with United Response in July 2011 as a Support Worker, assisting adults with disabilities in supported living and residential services. Since his dismissal from United Response in December 2018, Gregson has been a full-time carer for his parents and a campaigner and advocate for disability rights in the UK.

Notable family
Gregson's father, Terence Gregson, wrote BBC comedy in the 1970s and 1980s and was a lecturer at Leeds Beckett University. His brother, Dr John Gregson, is a Senior Lecturer in Criminology at Leeds Beckett University and is a published author having contributed a chapter to the book, Political Ideologies by Paul Wetherly. He has written a book on the Moral Philosophy and Life of Alasdair Macintyre. Gregson's Mother, Rosemary Alexandra Gregson, was awarded a British Empire Medal (BEM) for services to the community in Wetherby, in 2020.

Employment and Tribunal Hearing
Gregson was employed as a Support Worker by United Response in 2011. He was mainly based at the charity's premises in Highgate Park in Harrogate, North Yorkshire.  His employers were made aware upon the commencement of his employment of his longstanding conditions of anxiety, depression and obsessive–compulsive disorder.

The charity first raised concerns about Gregson's welfare and the risk of accidental harm to clients in November 2016 and placed restrictions on his duties.

Following an argument with a co-worker, Gregson received a disciplinary warning and was moved to another site in March 2017. Gregson successfully appealed the disciplinary warning on the grounds that his co-worker had instigated the argument and the decision to relocate him was reversed. An occupational health report undertaken upon his return to Harrogate found that Gregson was fit to return to work but that he could not undertake sleep-in shifts. Previous restrictions were kept in place and this led to a number of disputes between Gregson and his employer, eventually leading to his suspension from work in July 2017 pending a disciplinary investigation.

Gregson was formally diagnosed with autism in January 2018. Upon receiving confirmation of his diagnosis, his employer deliberated whether he could continue in his employment as they considered that he required close supervision which would be an unreasonable adjustment and too expensive. He was subsequently dismissed from work in December 2018.

The employment tribunal hearing, which took place in September 2019 and lasted 5 days, found that United Response had unfairly dismissed Gregson as they had failed to consider whether one of its own trained job coaches could work with Gregson and whether the Government's Access to Work Scheme could fund such a job coach. It had further ignored an occupational health expert's recommendation that they seek advice from the National Autistic Society. The tribunal judge, Judge Maidment, concluded that "In all the circumstances [United Response's] decision to terminate the claimant's employment fell outside the reasonable responses open to a reasonable employer." The judge further dismissed claims of direct disability discrimination and victimisation alleged by Gregson.

Media Coverage of the Tribunal Hearing
The case was reported in the media including articles appearing in Yorkshire Live, The Disability News Service and The Third Sector

Charity and Campaigning Work
Gregson is a member of the National Autistic Society and runs a voluntary autism drop in group in Harrogate. He has invited his local MP to visit and talk to participants about their experiences of living with autism in the community and in employment, and facilitated a meeting with North Yorkshire's Police, Crime and Fire Commissioner, Julia Mulligan, in May 2019 when they discussed disability hate crime, a consistent approach to safeguarding vulnerable adults in the community and a multi-agency approach to tackling far right groups. Gregson wrote to the Ministry of Justice in July 2019 to ask them to consider having autism accreditation and awareness training in line with some police forces and MPs and received a response back from the MOJ that they were implementing training and accreditation at a local level across its service.

Gregson is a volunteer with the campaigning groups Bullies Out, OCD Action, Rethink Mental Illness, Carers UK and some animal rights charities including the League Against Cruel Sports, Rewilding Britain and The British Hedgehog Preservation Society. Gregson wrote to the Vice Chancellor of University of Reading in November 2014 to raise concerns over pheasant shooting on university land which resulted in an internal review. The Vice Chancellor responded to Gregson following their review, confirming that they had agreed to end the practice from February 2020.

Gregson volunteers with the charity, Survivors, helping to support males who have become victims of hate crime and bullying.  Gregson also volunteers with the Peter Tatchell Foundation and the Quilliam (think tank) to promote equality and tackle extremism and hate crimes in society. Gregson works locally and nationally to raise the plight of carers having been a registered carer for his parents since 2018. This included raising the issue of sleep-in pay for carers with the then Shadow Minister for Mental Health and Social Care, Barbara Keeley MP, in December 2018.

Gregson has been an active member of the Royal Antediluvian Order of Buffaloes since 1998 and has served in a variety of offices including City Secretary from 2002 - 2005 and as a financial auditor and trustee. Gregson achieved the highest degree with the order on 5 November 2010 and is a stalwart of the A One Lodge. Through the Royal Antediluvian Order of Buffaloes, Gregson has taken part in numerous charity fundraising endeavours including successfully completing the London Marathon in 2005 having entered the race as an independent runner, raising £1300 for The Samaritans. Prior to this he canoed around Loch Ness and the Leeds and Liverpool Canal to raise money for Arthritis Research & Therapy in 2001 and completed a free-fall parachute jump for the Harrogate District Hospital Special Baby Care Unit in 2002. He completed the Yorkshire Three Peaks Challenge in 2004 to raise money for Victim Support and the three highest peaks in the UK in 2007 for the local branch of the Alzheimer's Society in Leeds.

Gregson has been an official wreath layer at the National Service of Remembrance since 2001.

Gregson runs a Community Interest Company, Important To Important For, which aims to tackle and support victims of childhood bullying and bullying in the workplace.

Author
Gregson has published 'Down in the Hollow', a collection of short children's stories which are featured on the website Short Kid's Stories  and several sci-fi and mystery books including 'Nothing of Interest: Collection of Short Stories,' which was featured in 'Booktime Magazine', 'The Mystery of Melsham Wood' and 'Smile'.

References 

British activists
1973 births
Living people